Delta Epsilon  was a college fraternity for men, founded in 1862 at Roanoke College, Virginia. Two of its three chapters went defunct due to the tumult of the Civil War, while the third became, in 1868, the restoration of an early chapter of Beta Theta Pi which then remained viable for 140 years.

History
Delta Epsilon was founded in 1862 at Roanoke College, Salem, Virginia. The Founders' intention was to limit the fraternity entirely to Virginia colleges.

The first edition of Baird's manual suggests that all three chapters "were weak", ostensibly due to their formation in the tumultuous days leading up to the Civil War. 

After establishing three chapters, Delta Epsilon became defunct, with one of these becoming a unit of Beta Theta Pi at Hampden–Sydney College in 1868, post-war. Baird's 2nd edition describes the Zeta chapter of Beta Theta Pi as having been "killed by the War", but notes that it was revived with the adoption of Delta Epsilon's sole remaining chapter.

Chapters

References

Defunct fraternities and sororities
Fraternities and sororities in the United States
1862 establishments in Virginia
Student organizations established in 1862